John Coffin Talbot (1784–1860) was an American businessperson and politician from Maine. Talbot, a Democrat, served 6 one-year terms in the Maine Legislature, including two in the Maine House of Representatives (1825; 1831) and four in the Maine Senate (1832-1833; 1836-1837). In his 4th and final Senate term, Talbot was elected Senate President.

Talbot was also successful in the lumber business. He was a resident of East Machias, Maine.

Talbot's son, John C. Talbot, Jr. served for many years in the Legislature, including as Speaker of the Maine House of Representatives from 1853 to 1854. In 1876, he was the Democratic Party's nominee for Governor.

References

1784 births
1860 deaths
People from East Machias, Maine
Businesspeople from Maine
Democratic Party members of the Maine House of Representatives
Presidents of the Maine Senate
Democratic Party Maine state senators
19th-century American politicians
19th-century American businesspeople